The Alerion Express 28, also called the Alerion 28, is an American sailboat that was designed by Carl Schumacher as a daysailer and cruiser and first built in 1990.

Production
The first seven production boats were built by Holby Marine of Bristol, Rhode Island United States  for Alerion Yachts in Warren, Rhode Island. After that boats were built by Tillotson Pearson, also of Rhode Island for Alerion Yachts. Production started in 1990 and it remained in production in 2021. By 2019, over 470 had been completed.

Design

The Alerion Express 28 is a recreational keelboat, built predominantly of fiberglass, with wood trim. It has a fractional sloop rig with a Hoyt self-tacking jib boom optional. The hull has a raked stem, an angled transom, an internally mounted spade-type rudder controlled by a tiller, a lazarette and a fixed fin keel. The early production boats displace  and carry  of lead ballast. Later production boats have a new keel design with a bulb weight, displace  and carry  of lead ballast.

The design has sleeping accommodation for three people, with a double "V"-berth in the bow cabin and a straight settee in the main cabin. The galley is located on the starboard side just forward of the companionway ladder. The galley is equipped with a stove and a sink. The portable head is located in the bow cabin, underneath the "V" berth.

Operational history
In a 2000 review naval architect Robert Perry wrote, "small boats are a good way to get back to basics. The Carl Schumacher-designed Alerion-Express is a great example. The general aesthetic model for this design is straight out of Nat Herreshoff's 1916 design Alerion. The gentle sweep of the sheer is balanced by moderate overhangs and freeboard that is low by today's standards. Beam is narrow, and the hull shape looks to be moderate in all aspects. The D/L ratio is 168. Below the waterline the design shows a modern fin keel and a semi-balanced spade rudder. To me this is the most exciting mix of design features. Take an attractive, dated topsides look and blend it with performance characteristics below the waterline. The result is a boat that has the romance of yesterday and the performance of today ... All gear is first rate and the overall look is one of a sophisticated and refined small yacht."

See also

List of sailing boat types

Related development
Alerion Express 19

Similar sailboats

Aloha 28
Beneteau First 285
Cal 28
Catalina 28
Cumulus 28
Grampian 28
Hunter 28
Hunter 28.5
J/28
Lancer 28
O'Day 28
Pearson 28
Sabre 28
Sea Sprite 27
Sirius 28
Tanzer 28
TES 28 Magnam
Viking 28

References

External links

Keelboats
1990s sailboat type designs
Sailing yachts
Sailboat type designs by Carl Schumacher
Sailboat types built by Pearson Yachts
Sailboat types built by Holby Marine